Arthur Percival Newton (1873–1942) was a historian of the British Empire who was Rhodes Professor of Imperial History at King's College London from 1920 to 1938. He was a general editor of The Cambridge History of the British Empire.

Selected publications
The colonising activities of the English Puritans: The last phase of the Elizabethan struggle with Spain. Yale University Press, New Haven, 1914.
The empire and the future, a series of imperial studies lectures delivered in the University of London, King's College. Macmillan, London, 1916.
An introduction to the study of colonial history. Society for Promoting Christian Knowledge, London, 1919.
The staple trades of the empire. Dent, London, 1918.

References

1873 births
1942 deaths
People educated at King Edward's School, Birmingham
Academics of King's College London
Fellows of King's College London
British historians